Anacamptis morio subsp. longicornu, formerly classified as Anacamptis longicornu, is a subspecies of orchid. It is found in southern Europe and western North Africa.

Description
This orchid's flowers are white, lavender, and purple; with a middle lob that is white with purple spots.  In contrast to the nominate subspecies, Anacamptis morio subsp.  morio, Anacamptis morio subsp. longicornu has a very long spur which is directed upwards.

Its bloom period is from February to May.

Distribution
Anacamptis morio subsp. longicornu is found in dry grassland, meadows, and pastures, on calcareous soils.

It is native to the western Mediterranean region, including:
Balearic Islands
Mallorca
France — Garrigue and Maquis shrublands. 
Corsica
Italy — Matorral shrublands.
Sardinia
Sicily
Algeria
Tunisia

References

External links 
 
 
 Albiflora.eu: Anacamptis morio subsp. longicornu

morio subsp. longicornu
Orchids of Europe
Flora of the Balearic Islands
Flora of Corsica
Flora of Sardinia
Flora of Sicily
Flora of Algeria
Flora of Tunisia
Matorral shrubland
Plant subspecies